Breed is a surname. Notable people with the surname include:

Colin Breed (born 1947), English politician
Lawrence M. Breed (20th century), American computer scientist
London Breed (born 1974), American politician
Michael Breed (born 1962), American golfer
Mildred Breed (born 1947), American bridge player
Urban Breed, Swedish singer
William J. Breed (1928–2013), American geologist, paleontologist, naturalist and writer
Mary Bidwell Breed (1870-1949), American chemist